Africa Morocco Link (AML) is a company in Morocco, founded in 2016, which operates at least 2 ferries.
The company operates from Tangier in Morocco and Algeciras in Spain. Together with Blue Star Ferries and Superfast Ferries, AML is a subsidiary company of Attica Group, which is listed on the Athens Stock Exchange.

History
Africa Morocco Link was created in 2016 following an agreement between BMCE Bank and Attica Holdings to operate scheduled ferry services from Morocco to Europe, through the newly established Moroccan company Africa Morocco Links (“AML”). Attica Group will hold a 49% participation in the new company, while 51% will be held by a group of Moroccan shareholders, led by BMCE Bank Of Africa Group.
Africa Morocco Link (AML) inaugurated operations between Almeria and Nador on Sunday 15 October with the Diagoras sailing at 13.00 from Almeria. This is their second line connecting Morocco with Europe since the start of their operations in 2016. The MV Diagoras left aml's fleet on December 26.

Fleet
Current Fleet

Former Fleet

References

External links
 https://www.aml.ma/en/

Ferry companies of Spain
Ferry companies of Morocco
Transport in Morocco
Ferries of Spain
Ferries of Morocco